The Yasna Haptanghaiti, Avestan for "Worship in Seven Chapters," is a set of seven hymns within the greater Yasna collection, that is, within the primary liturgical texts of the Zoroastrian Avesta. Chapter and verse pointers are to Yasna 35–41. The name is from Yasna 42, a Younger Avestan text that follows the seven chapters.

Age and importance
While the first two verses (i.e. Y. 35.1-2, cf. ) of the Yasna Haptanghaiti are in Younger Avestan, the rest of the seven hymns are in Gathic Avestan, the more archaic form of the Avestan language. That older part of the Yasna Haptanghaiti is generally considered to have been composed by the immediate disciples of Zoroaster, either during the prophet's lifetime or shortly after his death. Joanna Narten has suggested that, like the Gathas, the hymns of the Yasna Haptanghaiti were composed by Zoroaster himself, but this hypothesis has not received a significant following from the academic community.

In substance, the seven chapters are of great antiquity and contain allusions to the general (not necessarily Zoroaster-influenced) religious beliefs of the period in which Zoroaster was himself a priest. The texts are thus also of significance to scholars of religious history, and play a key role in the reconstruction of (Indo-)Iranian religion and for distinguishing Zoroaster's contributions from previously existing ideas and beliefs.

Structure and content
As represented within the greater Yasna liturgy, the Yasna Haptanghaiti are placed (and recited) between the first and second Gathas. Unlike the Gathas however, which are in verse, the Yasna Haptanghaiti is in prose. Analysis of the texts suggests that the hymns of the Yasna Haptanghaiti were composed as a discrete unit. The last verse of the last chapter suggests that the seven chapters represent the historical Yasna liturgy, around which the other chapters of the present-day Yasna were later organized. In that verse (41.6), the Yasna Haptanghaiti is personified as "the brave Yasna" and "the holy, the ritual chief."

The zand commentaries on the seven chapters summarize their contents as follows:

In the 19th century, Yasna 42 was considered to be a supplement to the Yasna Haptanghaiti, but later discussions of the liturgy do not include it as such. Yasna 42 is younger than the Yasna Haptanghaiti.

References
Notes

Bibliography

 .
 .

 .
 .
 .
 .

Further reading

 

Avesta